(Z)-4-Amino-2-butenoic acid (CACA, cis-4-aminocrotonic acid) is a GABA receptor partial agonist selective for the GABA-ρ (previously known as GABA) subtype.

References

Amino acids
Alkene derivatives
GABAA-rho receptor agonists